In the Mood for Love is a 2000 romantic drama film written, produced and directed by Wong Kar-wai. A co-production between Hong Kong and France, it portrays a man (Tony Leung) and a woman (Maggie Cheung) whose spouses have an affair together and who slowly develop feelings for each other. It forms the second part of an informal trilogy, alongside Days of Being Wild and 2046.

The film premiered at the Cannes Film Festival on 20 May 2000, to critical acclaim and a nomination for the Palme d'Or; Leung won Best Actor (the first Hong Kong actor to win the award). It is often listed as one of the greatest films of all time and one of the major works of Asian cinema. In a 2016 survey by the BBC, it was voted the second greatest film of the 21st century by 177 film critics from around the world, saying "never before has a film spoken so fluently in the universal language of loss and desire". In 2022, the film placed 5th in Sight & Sound "Greatest Films of All Time" critics' poll, rising from its previous position of 24th in 2012. It is the highest-ranked film between 1975 and 2022.

Plot

Opening intertitle
The following intertitle begins the film:

Summary
In 1962 British Hong Kong, Shanghai expatriates Chow Mo-wan, a journalist, and Su Li-zhen (Mrs. Chan), a secretary at a shipping company, rent rooms in adjacent apartments. Each has a spouse who works and often leaves them alone on overtime shifts. Due to the friendly but overbearing presence of a Shanghainese landlady, Mrs. Suen, and their bustling, mahjong-playing neighbours, Chow and Su are often alone in their rooms. Although they initially are friendly to each other only as need be, they grow closer as they realize that their spouses are having an affair.

Chow invites Su to help him write a martial arts serial. Their increased time together draws the attention of their neighbors, leading Chow to rent a hotel room where they can work together undistracted. As time passes, they acknowledge that they have developed feelings for each other. When Chow takes a job in Singapore, he asks Su to go with him. She agrees but arrives too late at the hotel to accompany him.

The next year, in Singapore, Chow relays a story to his friend about how in older times, when a person had a secret, they could go atop a mountain, make a hollow in a tree, and whisper it into the hollow and cover it with mud. Su arrives at Singapore and visits Chow's apartment. She calls Chow but remains silent when Chow picks up the phone. Later, Chow realizes she had visited his apartment after seeing a lipstick-stained cigarette butt in his ashtray.

Three years later, Su visits Mrs. Suen, who is about to emigrate to the United States, and inquires about whether her apartment is available for rent. Sometime later, Chow returns to Hong Kong to visit his former landlords the Koos, who have emigrated to the Philippines. He asks about the Suen family next door, and the new owner tells him a woman and her son are now living there. He leaves without realizing Su is the lady living there.

During the Vietnam War, Chow travels to Siem Reap, Cambodia, around the time of Charles de Gaulle's visit to the country (shown on film), and visits Angkor Wat. As a monk watches him, he whispers something unheard into a hollow in a wall there and plugs the hollow with mud. The scene fades out with views of the desolate temple complex.

Closing intertitle
After Chow leaves Angkor Wat, the following intertitle appears and concludes the film:

Cast
 Maggie Cheung as Su Li-zhen (Mrs. Chan)
 Tony Leung as Chow Mo-wan
 Siu Ping Lam as Ah Ping, Chow's co-worker
 Rebecca Pan as Mrs. Suen, the Chans' landlady
 Kelly Lai Chen as Mr. Ho, Su's employer
 Joe Cheung as man living in Mr. Koo's apartment
 Chan Man-Lei as Mr. Koo, the Chows' landlord
 Chin Tsi-ang as Suen's amah (female servant)
 Roy Cheung as Mr. Chan (voice)
 Paulyn Sun as Mrs. Chow

Title 
The film's original Chinese title, meaning "the age of blossoms" or "the flowery years" – a Chinese metaphor for the fleeting time of youth, beauty and love – derives from a song of the same name by Zhou Xuan from a 1946 film. The English title derives from the song "I'm in the Mood for Love". Director Wong had planned to name the film Secrets until listening to the song late in post-production.

Development and pre-production 

In the Mood for Love went through a long gestation period. In the 1990s, Wong Kar-wai found some commercial success, much critical acclaim, and wide influence on other filmmakers throughout Asia and the world with films such as Chungking Express and Fallen Angels, both set in present-day Hong Kong. His 1997 film Happy Together was also successful internationally, winning him Best Director at the Cannes Film Festival and surprising many. It was even popular with mainstream audiences in Hong Kong, despite its then-unusual focus on a gay love story and its having been largely improvised in Argentina, a landscape unfamiliar to Wong. By the end of the decade, with sovereignty of Hong Kong transferred from Britain to the People's Republic of China, Wong was eager to work once more in the mainland, where he had been born. He had been dissatisfied with the final result of his 1994 wuxia epic Ashes of Time, which was set in ancient times and filmed in remote desert regions, and decided to deal with a more 20th-century, urban setting.

By 1998, Wong had developed a concept for his next film Summer in Beijing. Although no script was finalized, he and cameraman Christopher Doyle had been to Tiananmen Square and other areas of the city to do a small amount of unauthorized shooting. Wong told journalists the film was to be a musical and a love story. Wong secured the participation of Tony Leung Chiu-wai and Maggie Cheung to star, and with his background in graphic design, had even made posters for the film. He had begun work on script treatments, which since Days of Being Wild, he tended to treat as only a very loose basis for his work to secure financing, preferring to leave things open to change during the shoot.

It transpired that there would be difficulties securing permission to shoot in Beijing with Wong's spontaneous methods of working and potential political sensitivities in setting his film in mid-20th century China. Wong had come to think of Summer in Beijing as a triptych of stories, much like his original concept of Chungking Express (in which the third story had been spun off into the film Fallen Angels). Quickly, Wong decided to jettison this structure, saving only one of the three planned stories, which had been titled provisionally, A Story of Food, and dealt with a woman and a man who shared noodles and secrets. As he reunited with his actors and production team, most of whom had collaborated several times before, Wong decided A Story of Food would be the heart of his next film. The story would slowly evolve into In the Mood for Love, after transposing its setting away from mainland China and back to 1960s Hong Kong.

Wong had set his breakthrough Days of Being Wild in that time in Hong Kong, when mainland-born Chinese and their memories, including those of Wong, then a young child, had a strong presence in the territory. Still saturated with the sounds of 1930s and 1940s Shanghai singing stars and the ideals they represented, the time also reminded him of the wide array of vibrant dance music floating in over the Pacific from the Philippines, Hawaii, Latin America and the United States, which Wong had used as a backdrop in Days of Being Wild. Wong had regarded Days of Being Wild upon its release in 1990 as an artistic success, and had planned a sequel to it. However, his producers had been disappointed by its box-office returns, particularly given that its shoot had been prolonged and expensive, with Wong, who had come out of the Hong Kong industry, first attempting to work more independently, including collaborating for the first time with cinematographer Christopher Doyle, who favored jazz-like spontaneity in his shooting methods. Despite involving many of Hong Kong's top stars, the film's profits had been modest, so Wong was not given the opportunity to follow it up. Yet as he moved on to other films, he had always retained the dream of doing so. With the impossibility of the original idea of Summer in Beijing, he was now able to pursue it.

The cast of Maggie Cheung and Tony Leung in A Story of Food (soon to become In the Mood for Love) provided an opportunity to pick up a loose thread of Days of Being Wild, as the actors had appeared in that film, although never together. Leung's few scenes had been left incomplete, awaiting Wong's planned sequel that was never made. 2046, a sequel in its plot to In the Mood for Love, would later serve for Wong as a sequel in spirit to Days of Being Wild, connecting the story of Leung's character in Days and In the Mood. The writing of 2046 essentially began at the same time as that of In the Mood for Love. Because neither film had its plot, structure, or even all its characters, scripted in advance, Wong began working on the ideas that eventually made it into 2046 during the shoot of In the Mood for Love. As he and his collaborators made the film in a variety of settings, its story took shape. Eventually, these constantly developing ideas, taken from one of the remnants of Summer in Beijing, were developed too much to fit into one film. Wong discarded most of the footage and story before arriving at In the Mood, later reshooting and reimagining the rest as 2046.

Production
Wong's plan to make a film set primarily in Hong Kong did not simplify matters when it came to the shoot. The city's appearance was much changed since the 1960s, and Wong's personal nostalgia for the time added to his desire for historical accuracy. Wong had little taste for working in studio settings, let alone using special effects to imitate the look of past times. Christopher Doyle later discussed the necessity of filming where the streets, the buildings, and even the sight of clothes hanging on lines (as in 1960s Hong Kong) could give a real energy to the actors and the story, whose outlines were constantly open to revision as shooting progressed. While set in Hong Kong, a portion of the filming (like outdoor and hotel scenes) was shot in less modernized neighborhoods of Bangkok, Thailand. Further, a brief portion later in the film is set in Singapore (one of Wong's initial inspirations on the story had been a short story set in Hong Kong, Intersection, by the Hong Kong writer Liu Yichang). In its final sequences, the film also incorporates footage of Angkor Wat, Cambodia, where Leung's character is working as a journalist.

The film took 15 months to shoot. The actors found the process inspiring but demanding. They required a lot of work to understand the times, being slightly younger than Wong and having grown up in a rapidly changing Hong Kong or, in Maggie Cheung's case, partly in the United Kingdom.

Cheung portrayed 1930s Chinese screen icon Ruan Lingyu in Stanley Kwan's 1992 film Center Stage, for which she wore qipao, the dresses worn by stylish Chinese women throughout much of the first half of the 20th century. It had been Cheung's most recognized performance to date and her hardest, partly due to the clothing, which restricted her freedom of movement. For Wong's film, Cheung, playing a married woman in her thirties who had carried over the elegance of her younger years in the pre-revolutionary mainland, would again wear qipao, known in Cantonese as cheongsam, and spoke of it as the way of understanding her character Su Li-zhen, whose quiet strength Cheung felt was unlike her own more spontaneous spirit.

The cinematographer Christopher Doyle, for whom the film was the sixth collaboration with Wong Kar-wai, had to leave when production went over schedule and was replaced by Mark Lee Ping Bin, renowned for his work with Taiwanese filmmaker Hou Hsiao-hsien. Both DPs are credited equally for the final film. Some scenes in the final cut are thought to have been shot by each, with some critics noting differences between Doyle's more kinetic style as seen in earlier Wong movies, and the more subtle long shots of Lee framing key parts of In the Mood for Love.

Critic Tony Rayns, on the other hand, noted in a commentary on another Wong film that the differing styles of the two cinematographers were blended seamlessly by Wong's own fluid aesthetic. Like all of Wong's previous work, this one was shot on film, not digitally.

Doyle's departure did not result from major artistic arguments with Wong. However, despite his agreement with Wong's spontaneous approach to scripting, he found it frustrating to reshoot many of the key moments over and over in environments throughout Southeast Asia until they felt right to the director. He had to turn down many other projects due to the total commitment, without a clear time limit, required by Wong. Several years later Doyle initially signed on to work on the sequel 2046, but he also abandoned that project halfway through for similar reasons (being replaced by a range of DPs) and has not worked with Wong since. Tony Leung, on the other hand, returned to work on 2046, in which he starred without Maggie Cheung, who made only a brief appearance in already shot footage from In the Mood for Love. Leung also starred in Wong's 2013 film, The Grandmaster. Cheung felt In the Mood for Love was the high point of her career, and she has worked much more infrequently since, starring in several films soon after but within four years, all but retired from acting, despite winning a Best Actress Award at Cannes for 2004's Clean.

The final months of production and post-production on In the Mood for Love, a submission to the Cannes Film Festival in May 2000, were notorious for their confusion. The film was barely finished in time for the festival, as would occur again four years later when Wong submitted 2046. Wong continued shooting more and more of In the Mood for Love with the cast and crew as he worked furiously to edit the massive amounts of footage he had shot over the past year. He removed large chunks of the story to strip it down to its most basic element, the relationship between these characters in the 1960s, with brief allusions to earlier and later times. In the meantime, Wong screened brief segments before the festival for journalists and distributors. Despite the general lack of commercial interest in Chinese cinema at the time by North American media corporations, Wong was given a distribution deal for a limited theatrical release in North America on USA Films, based only on a few minutes of footage.

By early 2000, with the deadline for Cannes approaching, Wong was contacted by the director of Cannes, who encouraged him to quickly complete a final cut, and offered a constructive criticism about the title. Although the title in Cantonese and Mandarin is based on a Zhou Xuan song whose English title is translated "Age of Bloom", the international title proved more complex. After discarding Summer in Beijing and A Story of Food, Wong had provisionally settled on Secrets, but Cannes felt this title was not as distinctive as the film Wong was preparing and suggested he should change it.

Finally having completed the cut, but at a loss for titles, Wong was listening to a then-recent album by Bryan Ferry and Roxy Music titled Slave to Love: The Very Best of the Ballads, and noticed a resonance in the song "I'm in the Mood for Love", which shared its title with a popular jazz standard of the mid-20th century. Many of Wong's previous English-language titles had come from pop songs, so he found this title particularly appropriate.

Wong states he was influenced by Hitchcock's Vertigo while making this film and compares Tony Leung's character to James Stewart's:

Title song
The title track "Hua Yang De Nian Hua" is a song by famous singer Zhou Xuan from the Solitary Island period. The 1946 song is a paean to a happy past and an oblique metaphor for the darkness of Japanese-occupied Shanghai. Wong also set the song to his 2000 short film, named Hua Yang De Nian Hua, after the track.

Soundtrack
 Shigeru Umebayashi: "Yumeji's Theme" (originally from the soundtrack of Seijun Suzuki's Yumeji)
 Michael Galasso: "Angkor Wat Theme", "ITMFL", "Casanova/Flute"
 Nat King Cole: "Aquellos Ojos Verdes", "Te Quiero Dijiste", "Quizás, Quizás, Quizás"
 Bryan Ferry: "I'm in the Mood for Love" (the inspiration for the English title, found on, e.g., the French two-CD soundtrack, not in the film)
 Zhou Xuan:《花樣的年華》 "Hua Yang De Nian Hua" (the inspiration for the original Chinese title)
 Rebecca Pan: "Bengawan Solo"
 All of the traditional pingtan, Cantonese, Beijing and Yue operas are historic recordings

Box office and distribution
In the Mood for Love made HK$8,663,227 during its Hong Kong run.

On 2 February 2001, the film opened in six North American theatres, earning $113,280 ($18,880 per screen) in its first weekend. It finished its North American run with a gross of $2,738,980.

The total worldwide box office gross was US$12,854,953.

Home media
The film has been released on DVD and Blu-ray, most notably by the Criterion Collection, who released a restored high-definition digital transfer in the United States in 2012.

Reception and legacy
On Rotten Tomatoes, the film holds an approval rating of 91% based on 144 reviews, with an average rating of 8.0/10. The website's critical consensus reads: "This understated romance, featuring good performances by its leads, is both visually beautiful and emotionally moving". On Metacritic, the film has a weighted average score of 85 out of 100 based on 28 critic reviews, indicating "universal acclaim". Roger Ebert of the Chicago Sun-Times gave the film three stars out of four, calling it "a lush story of unrequited love". Elvis Mitchell, writing for The New York Times, referred to it as "probably the most breathtakingly gorgeous film of the year".

Peter Travers of Rolling Stone wrote that "in the hands of a hack, In the Mood for Love could have been a snickering sex farce. In the hands of Wong Kar-wai ... the film is alive with delicacy and feeling". Peter Walker of The Guardian, describing it as his "favourite film", wrote that it provides "profound and moving reflections on life's fundamentals. It's a film about, yes, love; but also betrayal, loss, missed opportunities, memory, the brutality of time's passage, loneliness—the list goes on". David Parkinson of Empire awarded the film five out of five stars, writing that "the performances are masterly, and the photography beautiful. It's a genuinely romantic romance and makes for sublime cinema". jmc of Notes on Cinema writes: "Why does Wong Kar Wai begin the end of the film with a brief glimpse at Cambodian foreign relations[?] Cambodia, like the rest of Southeast Asia in the 1960s, is a victim of the actions of others [and] might be trying to put on a brave face when Charles de Gaulle visits; behind its countenance is anger at what others have done to it".

Lists
In 2000, Empire ranked it number 42 in its list titled "The 100 Best Films of World Cinema". It was ranked 95th on 100 Best Films from 1983 to 2008 by Entertainment Weekly. In November 2009, Time Out New York ranked the film as the fifth-best of the decade, calling it the "consummate unconsummated love story of the new millennium".

They Shoot Pictures, Don't They?, a review aggregator covering the history of cinema, lists In the Mood for Love as the 42nd most acclaimed film of all time, making it the most widely acclaimed film released anywhere in the world since its release in 2000. In the 2022 Sight & Sound critics poll, In the Mood for Love appeared at number 5, making it the highest ranked film from the 2000s and one of only two from the 2000s to be listed in the top 10 of all time, along with David Lynch's Mulholland Drive. Wong's film was also the highest ranked film by a Chinese filmmaker. The film owed its placement to the votes of 42 critics (out of 846) who placed it in their own individual top 10 lists.

Three years later, Sofia Coppola credited In the Mood for Love as her largest inspiration on her Academy Award-winning film Lost in Translation, which ended with secrets being shared, and made important use of another song by Bryan Ferry. Lost in Translations iconic opening shot was inspired by a shot from In the Mood for Love. Coppola thanked Wong Kar-wai in her Oscar acceptance speech.

In 2015, the Busan International Film Festival ranked the film No. 3 in its Asian Cinema 100 list, behind Yasujirō Ozu's Tokyo Story and Akira Kurosawa's Rashomon.

In 2016, the film appeared in second place on BBC's list of 100 Greatest Films of the 21st Century after Mulholland Drive. The film ranked 9th in BBC's 2018 list of The 100 greatest foreign language films voted by 209 film critics from 43 countries around the world.

In 2019, The Guardian ranked the film fifth in its Best Films of the 21st Century list. In 2021 the film was ranked at No. 8 on Time Out magazine's list of The 100 best movies of all time.

In 2022, Sight & Sound ranked the film 5th on its "Greatest Films of All Time" critics' poll.

Awards
 2000 Cannes Film Festival
 Won: Best Actor (Tony Leung Chiu-wai)
 Won: Technical Grand Prize (Christopher Doyle, Lee Ping-bing, William Chang)
 Nominated: Palme d'Or
 2001 Hong Kong Film Awards
 Won: Best Actor (Tony Leung Chiu-wai)
 Won: Best Actress (Maggie Cheung)
 Won: Best Art Direction (William Chang)
 Won: Best Costume and Make-up Design (William Chang)
 Won: Best Film Editing (William Chang)
 Nominated: Best Picture
 Nominated: Best Director (Wong Kar-wai)
 Nominated: Best Supporting Actress (Poon Dick-wah)
 Nominated: Best Screenplay (Wong Kar-wai)
 Nominated: Best New Performer (Siu Ping-lam)
 Nominated: Best Cinematography (Christopher Doyle, Lee Pin-bing)
 Nominated: Best Original Score (Michael Galasso)
 2000 Golden Horse Film Festival and Awards
 Won: Best Actress (Maggie Cheung)
 2001 Hong Kong Film Critics Society Awards
 Won: Best Director (Wong Kar-wai)
 Won: Film of merit
 2001 Belgian Syndicate of Cinema Critics (Belgium)
 Won: Grand Prix
 2002 National Society of Film Critics (USA)
 Won: Best Foreign Language Film
 Won: Best Cinematography (Christopher Doyle, Lee Pin-bing)
2001 César Awards
 Won: Best Foreign Film
 2001 German Film Awards
 Won: Best Foreign Film
 2001 New York Film Critics Circle Awards
 Won: Best Foreign Language Film
 Won: Best Cinematography (Christopher Doyle, Lee Pin-bing)
2001 BAFTA Awards
 Nominated: Best Foreign Language Film
 2002 Argentine Film Critics Association Awards
 Won: Best Foreign Language Film
 2000 Asia-Pacific Film Festival
 Won: Best Cinematography (Christopher Doyle, Lee Pin-bing)
 Won: Best Editing (William Chang)
 2001 Australian Film Institute Awards
 Nominated: Best Foreign Language Film
 2001 British Independent Film Awards
 Won: Best Foreign Language Film
 2002 Broadcast Film Critics Association Awards
 Nominated: Best Foreign Language Film

See also
 List of films set in Hong Kong

References

External links

 
 
 
 
 
 
 
 In the Mood for Love: Haunted Heart – an essay by Steve Erickson at The Criterion Collection

2000 films
2000 romantic drama films
2000s Cantonese-language films
2000s French films
2000s Hong Kong films
Adultery in films
Best Foreign Film César Award winners
European Film Awards winners (films)
Films directed by Wong Kar-wai
Films scored by Shigeru Umebayashi
Films set in 1962
Films set in Cambodia
Films set in Hong Kong
Films set in Shanghai
Films set in Singapore
Films shot in Cambodia
Films shot in Macau
Films shot in Shanghai
Films shot in Thailand
French nonlinear narrative films
French romantic drama films
Hong Kong New Wave films
Hong Kong nonlinear narrative films
Hong Kong romantic drama films
Shanghainese-language films